Muḥammad ibn ʿAlī ibn ʿAbd Allāh or Muḥammad al-Imām (679/80 - 744) was the son of Ali ibn Abd Allah ibn al-Abbas and great-grandson of al-‘Abbas ibn ‘Abd al-Muttalib, the uncle of the Islamic prophet, Muhammad. Born in Humeima in Jordan, he was the father of the two first 'Abbâsid caliphs, Al-Saffah and Al-Mansur, and as such was the progenitor of the Abbasid dynasty.

Revolt of Mukhtar al-Thaqafi 

When al-Mukhtar announced the revenge of Imam al-Husayn, he showed himself as the representative of Muhammad ibn al-Hanafiyyah, the Promised Mehdi according to him.

Sixth Imam of Kaysanites 

After the death of Muhammad ibn al-Hanafiyyah, the imamate of Kaysanites Shia transferred to his son Abu Hashim, who transferred it to Muhammad, paving the way for the Abbasid dawa and the Abbasid Revolution.

His ancestors and the family tree

Succession for the Imāms of Hashimiyya sect

See also 
 As-Saffah

References

Further reading 
https://referenceworks.brillonline.com/entries/encyclopaedia-of-islam-2/*-SIM_5342

Abbasids
7th-century Arabs
Year of birth uncertain
744 deaths
8th-century Arabs